Alexander Pope Field (November 30, 1800 – August 19, 1876) was an American lawyer and politician.  He was the 21st Attorney General of Louisiana, the 6th Illinois Secretary of State, and the 4th Secretary of the Wisconsin Territory.

Biography
Born in Louisville, Kentucky, he moved to Jonesboro, Illinois, studied law, and was admitted to the Illinois bar. His uncle was Nathaniel Pope. From 1822 until 1828, he served in the Illinois House of Representatives and supported Andrew Jackson as a Democrat and later became a Whig. He served in the United States Army, in the Black Hawk War of 1832 and was brigade inspector. From 1829 until 1840, he served as Illinois Secretary of State. Field moved to Wisconsin Territory and served as the territory's secretary from 1841 to 1843. He then moved to Saint Louis, Missouri, in 1845.

In 1849, Field moved to New Orleans, Louisiana, and was elected Louisiana Attorney General serving from 1873 until his death.

Notes

People from Union County, Illinois
Politicians from St. Louis
American people of the Black Hawk War
Politicians from New Orleans
Politicians from Louisville, Kentucky
Secretaries of State of Illinois
Secretaries of State of Wisconsin
Members of the Illinois House of Representatives
Louisiana Attorneys General
Illinois Democrats
Illinois Whigs
19th-century American politicians
1800 births
1876 deaths
Lawyers from New Orleans
19th-century American lawyers